Provincial road N307 (N307) is a road connecting Rijksweg 6 (A6) and N302 near Lelystad with Rijksweg 50 (N50) in Kampen.

Exit list

References

External links

307
307
307